Tetrachlorocyclopropene is a chemical compound with the formula C3Cl4.  A colorless liquid, the compound is a reagent used to prepare acetylene derivatives and in organic synthesis.  It is prepared by addition of dichlorocarbene to trichloroethylene.

The compound is used to prepare arylpropiolic acids:
C3Cl4  +  ArH  +  2 H2O  →  ArC2CO2H  +  4 HCl

Under some circumstances, diarylation occurs, giving diarylcyclopropenones, which decarbonylate to give diarylacetylenes. These reactions are thought to proceed via the intermediacy of trichlorocyclopropenium electrophile (C3Cl3+).

References

Organochlorides
Cyclopropenes